Survakari Nunatak (‘Nunatak Survakari’ \'nu-na-tak sur-va-'ka-ri\) is the rocky hill rising to 849 m in upper Sjögren Glacier, in the southeast foothills of Detroit Plateau on southern Trinity Peninsula in Graham Land, Antarctica.

The nunatak is named after the Bulgarian New Year’s folkloric ritual of ‘Survakari’.

Location

Maps
 Antarctic Digital Database (ADD). Scale 1:250000 topographic map of Antarctica. Scientific Committee on Antarctic Research (SCAR). Since 1993, regularly upgraded and updated.

Notes

References
 Survakari Nunatak. SCAR Composite Antarctic Gazetteer
 Bulgarian Antarctic Gazetteer. Antarctic Place-names Commission. (details in Bulgarian, basic data in English)

External links
 Survakari Nunatak. Copernix satellite image

Nunataks of Trinity Peninsula
Bulgaria and the Antarctic